Annulatubus is a genus of the Ediacaran biota (635-542 Ma) found in Northwest Canada, and Northern Siberia.  It has been found in both shallow water and deep-water assemblages no older than 560 Ma placing it within the youngest Ediacaran.

Morphology 
Annulatubus, meaning ringed tube, possesses a long tube-like structure with uniformly spaced ridges.  At lengths between 178mm, and 250mm, and widths between 15mm and 50mm it is significantly larger than most other tube-like fossils of the Ediacaran. 
 
It is described as having a similar ringed tube structure to Sekwitibulus but differs in size and ridge shape.  It is unknown if Annulatubus possessed a holdfast like other similar Ediacarans.

Diversity 
The only known species within the genus is Annulatubus flexuosus.

Discovery 
Annulatubus flexuosus was discovered in the Blueflower formation from the Mackenzie Mountains of Northwest Canada. In 2008 a similar Ediacaran was discovered from the late Ediacaran Khatyspyt formation of Northern Siberia by Dmitriy V. Grazhdankin, Uwe Balthasar, Konstantin E. Nagovitsin, and Boris B. Kochnev. Carbone et al. recognized the specimen that Grazhdankin et al. described as belonging to the Annulatubus genus but not enough material exists to recognize it as A. flexuosus or a new species.

Distribution 
Annulatubus has been found in the sandstone beds of the Blueflower Formation in Northwest Canada and within the mudstones of the Khatyspyt Formation of Northern Siberia.

Ecology 
The lifestyle of Annulatubus is unknown other than it has been found in both shallow and deep-water deposits.

See also 
List of Ediacaran genera
Blueflower Formation

References 

Ediacaran life